McNulty Reservoir is an earthen dammed reservoir in Malheur County in the U.S. state of Oregon. The reservoir is for water storage and serves as recreational area, which is promoted to anglers. The lake is named for the Dublin-born Northwest pioneer John McNulty.

See also
List of lakes in Oregon
McNulty Reservoir Dam in Eagle County, Colorado
Upper McNulty Reservoir, upstream from this reservoir

References

External links
 Hook and Bullet

Dams in Oregon
Buildings and structures in Malheur County, Oregon